Isachneae is a tribe of tropical and subtropical grasses in subfamily Micrairoideae, with around 120 species in six genera.

Genera
Coelachne
Heteranthoecia
Hubbardia
Isachne
Limnopoa
Sphaerocaryum

References

Micrairoideae
Poaceae tribes